Centrins, also known as caltractins, are a family of calcium-binding phosphoproteins found in the centrosome of eukaryotes. Centrins are present in the centrioles and pericentriolar lattice. Human centrin genes are CETN1, CETN2 and CETN3.

History

Centrin was first isolated and characterized from the flagellar roots
of the green alga Tetraselmis striata in 1984.

Function
Centrins are required for duplication of centrioles. They may also play a role in severing of microtubules by causing calcium-mediated contraction. The majority of centrin in the cell is non-centrosomal whose function is not yet clear.

Structure
Centrin belongs to the EF-hand superfamily of calcium-binding proteins and has four calcium-binding EF-hands. It has a molecular weight of 20 kDa.

See also
 Centriole
 Centrosome

References

Protein families